Principat is the word for principality in the Catalan language and most Occitan varieties. A few entities with this name are:

 Principality of Catalonia, a state that existed from the 12-18th centuries. 

 Principality of Monaco
 Principality of Andorra 

CE Principat, a former Andorran football club